Scrub brush or scrubbrush may refer to:

 Shrubland, an environmental habitat characterized by vegetation dominated by shrubs
 Silkworm (missile), a missile with the NATO reporting name "Scrubbrush"
 Tawashi, a Japanese traditional scrubbing brush
 Toilet brush, a scrubbing brush for cleaning toilets
 Investment, a security or asset expected to increase in value over time.